Parannoul (born 2001) is an anonymous South Korean shoegaze musician. He has released three solo albums: Let's Walk on the Path of a Blue Cat (2020), To See the Next Part of the Dream (2021), and After the Magic (2023). He also released a split album, Downfall of the Neon Youth (2021) with fellow shoegaze musicians Asian Glow and sonhos tomam conta. Parannoul has also released music under other pseudonyms, including Rough and Beautiful Place (2022) as Mydreamfever, as well as several now-deleted albums as laststar.

Career 
Parannoul released his first album Let's Walk on the Path of a Blue Cat in 2020 and To See the Next Part of the Dream in 2021 through Bandcamp. He has gained popularity through Bandcamp, Rate Your Music, and Reddit. His second album was reviewed on Pitchfork, Consequence of Sound, and Stereogum. He featured on the split album Downfall of the Neon Youth with Asian Glow and sonhos tomam conta, contributing four tracks, which was released on October 22, 2021.

Parannoul describes himself as "just a student writing music in my bedroom". In an interview with Sonemic, Parannoul stated that the album cover for his album To See the Next Part of the Dream "is actually one of the scenes from リリイ・シュシュのすべて All About Lily Chou-Chou. It's not an important scene at all, it's just a scene that lasts five seconds...But for some reason, the smokestack and the white smoke made me feel nostalgic. (Actually the whole movie feels that way.) When I first saw the factory with smokestacks, I felt stuffy and uncomfortable, like we won't have freedom inside there. On the other hand, I felt something contradictory when I saw the pure white smoke coming out of it. I wanted to show the clean yet dirty side of youth through this smokestack. The little birds above the smoke show the mind of the teenager that wanted to be free."

On 1 January 2022, Parannoul released Rough and Beautiful Place under the pseudonym Mydreamfever. The release is a departure from the shoegaze style present on his Parannoul works, with the album being described as ambient and new-age. Rough and Beautiful Place was featured as Bandcamp's "Album of the Day" shortly after its release. His third album under the name Parannoul, After the Magic, was released on January 28, 2023.

Discography

Albums 
 In The Purest Sense (2017) (Released under the name laststar)
 Winter Rain, Winter Rain (2018) (Released under the name laststar)
 Strange Days (2018) (Released under the name laststar)
 꽃샘추위 (Recurrence) (2018) (Released under the name laststar)
 Sleepless (2018) (Released under the name laststar)
 Tomorrow's They And I (2018) (Released under the name laststar)
 Egoletter (2018) (Released under the name laststar)
 Our Last Summer (2018) (Released under the name laststar)
 In The City Made Of Echoes (2018) (Released under the name laststar)
 Introvert Love Connection (2018) (Released under the name laststar)
 Behind The Shadow (2019) (Released under the name laststar)
 Covers +1 (2019) (Released under the name laststar)
 Stars Whisper To Me Tonight (2019) (Released under the name laststar)
 Let's Walk on the Path of a Blue Cat (2020)
 To See the Next Part of the Dream (2021)
 Downfall of the Neon Youth (2021) (Split album with Asian Glow and sonhos tomam conta)
 Rough and Beautiful Place (2022) (Released under the name Mydreamfever)
 After the Magic (2023)

EPs 
 기억일기 (Memory Diary) (2017) (Released under the name laststar)
 White Ceiling / Black Dots Wandering Around (2022)
 Paraglow (2022) (Collaboration with Asian Glow)

Singles 
 Anywhere, Anytime (2021) (Released under the name Mydreamfever)
 Into the Endless Night (2021)
 Insomnia (2022)
 We Shine at Night (2023)

References

External links
 Parannoul on Bandcamp
 Mydreamfever on Bandcamp

Living people
South Korean rock musicians
Shoegaze musicians
Year of birth missing (living people)